Agartala - Silchar Express is an Indian Express train belonging to Northeast Frontier Railway zone of Indian Railways that runs between the capital city of Tripura & largest city in Barak Valley of Assam, that is, Agartala & Silchar. It is currently being operated with 15663/15664 train numbers on a daily basis. The train makes its main halt at Karimganj Junction for 25 minutes & loco/rake reversals also takes place here. The train runs with SGUJ/WDP-4 & SGUJ/WDP-4D.

Average speed and frequency 

The 15663/Agartala - Silchar Express runs with an average speed of 28 km/h and completes 254 km in 7hrs 25 min. The 15664/Silchar - Agartala Express runs with an average speed of 27 km/h and completes 254 km in 7hrs 30min.

Route and halts 

The important halts of the train are:

Agartala
Teliamura
Ambassa
 Kumarghat
Dharmanagar
 Churaibari
 Kalkalighat

 Baraigram Junction
 Nilambazar

 New Karimganj
 Bhanga

Coach composite 

The train has standard ICF rakes with max speed of 100 kmph. The train consists of 18 coaches:

 1 AC III Tier
 1 Sleeper Class
 1 Second Sitting
 13 General Unreserved
 2 Seating cum Luggage Rake

Traction

Both trains are hauled by a Siliguri Loco Shed based WDP-4 diesel locomotive from Agartala to Silchar and vice versa.

Direction Reversal

Train Reverses its direction 1 time:

See also 

 Agartala railway station
 Silchar railway station
 Agartala - Dharmanagar Passenger

Notes

References

External links 

 55663/Agartala - Silchar Passenger
 55664/Silchar - Agartala Passenger

Transport in Silchar
Transport in Agartala
Rail transport in Assam
Rail transport in Tripura
Slow and fast passenger trains in India
Railway services introduced in 2015